The following list of hospitals in the U.S. state of Indiana, sorted by hospital name, is based on data provided by the Indiana State Department of Health.

Adams Memorial Hospital – Decatur
Ascension St. Vincent Kokomo- Kokomo, Indiana
Bedford Regional Medical Center – Bedford
BHC Valle Vista Hospital – Greenwood
Blackford Community Hospital – Hartford City
Bloomington Hospital of Orange County – Paoli
Bloomington Meadows Hospital – Bloomington
Bluffton Regional Medical Center – Bluffton
Cameron Memorial Community Hospital – Angola
Clark Memorial Health - Jeffersonville
Columbus Regional Health – Columbus
Community Hospital – Munster
Community Hospital of Anderson and Madison County – Anderson
Community Hospital of Bremen – Bremen
Community Hospital East – Indianapolis
Community Hospital North – Indianapolis
Community Hospital South – Indianapolis
Community Howard Regional Health – Kokomo
Community Mental Health Center – Lawrenceburg
Daviess Community Hospital – Washington
Deaconess Cross Pointe Center – Evansville
Deaconess Gateway and Women's Hospital – Newburgh
Deaconess Hospital – Evansville
Dearborn County Hospital – Lawrenceburg
Decatur County Memorial Hospital – Greensburg
DeKalb Memorial Hospital – Auburn
Dukes Memorial Hospital – Peru
Dunn Memorial Hospital – Bedford
Dupont Hospital – Fort Wayne
Elkhart General Hospital – Elkhart
Evansville Psychiatric Children's Center – Evansville
Fayette Memorial Hospital Association – Connersville
Floyd Memorial Hospital and Health Services – New Albany
Four County Counseling Center – Logansport
Franciscan Health Carmel – Carmel
Franciscan Health Crawfordsville – Crawfordsville
Franciscan Health Crown Point – Crown Point
Franciscan Health Dyer – Dyer
Franciscan Health Hammond – Hammond
Franciscan Health Indianapolis – Indianapolis
Franciscan Health Lafayette Central – Lafayette
Franciscan Health Lafayette East – Lafayette
Franciscan Health Michigan City – Michigan City
Franciscan Health Mooresville – Mooresville
Franciscan Health Munster – Munster
Franciscan Health Rensselaer – Rensselaer
Gibson General Hospital – Princeton
Greene County General Hospital – Linton
Good Samaritan Hospital – Vincennes
Goshen General Hospital – Goshen
Grant-Blackford Mental Health – Marion
Greene County General Hospital – Linton
Hamilton Center – Terre Haute
Hancock Regional Hospital – Greenfield
Harrison County Hospital – Corydon
HealthSouth Deaconess Rehabilitation Hospital – Evansville
HealthSouth Hospital of Terre Haute – Terre Haute
Heart Center of Indiana – Indianapolis
Hendricks Regional Health – Danville
Henry County Memorial Hospital – New Castle
Hind General Hospital – Hobart
Indiana University Health Arnett Hospital - Lafayette
Indiana University Health Ball Memorial Hospital – Muncie
Indiana University Health Bloomington Hospital - Bloomington
Indiana University Health La Porte Hospital – La Porte
Indiana University Health Methodist Hospital - Indianapolis
Indiana University Health North Hospital – Carmel
Indiana University Health Saxony Hospital – Fishers
Indiana University Health Starke Hospital – Knox
Indiana University Health Tipton Hospital – Tipton
Indiana University Health West Hospital – Avon
Indiana University Health University Hospital – Indianapolis
Jay County Hospital – Portland
Johnson Memorial Hospital – Franklin
Kindred Hospital – Indianapolis
King's Daughters Hospital and Health Services – Madison
Kosciusko Community Hospital – Warsaw
Larue D. Carter Memorial Hospital – Indianapolis
Logansport Memorial Hospital – Logansport
Logansport State Hospital – Logansport
Lutheran Hospital of Indiana – Fort Wayne
Madison State Hospital – Madison
Major Hospital – Shelbyville
Margaret Mary Community Hospital – Batesville
Marion General Hospital – Marion
Medical Behavioral Hospital - Mishawaka – Mishawaka
Medical Center of Southern Indiana – Charlestown
Memorial Hospital and Health Care Center – Jasper
Memorial Hospital of South Bend – South Bend
Methodist Hospitals – Gary and Merrillville
Michiana Behavioral Health Center – Plymouth
Morgan Hospital & Medical Center – Martinsville
NeuroDiagnostic Institute – Indianapolis
Northeastern Center – Auburn
Oaklawn Psychiatric Center – Goshen
OrthoIndy Hospital – Indianapolis
Otis R. Bowen Center for Human Services – Warsaw
Our Lady of Peace Hospital – South Bend
Parkview Hospital Randallia – Fort Wayne
Parkview Huntington Hospital – Huntington
Parkview LaGrange Hospital – LaGrange
Parkview Noble Hospital – Kendallville
Parkview Regional Medical Center – Fort Wayne
Parkview Whitley Hospital – Columbia City
Perry County Memorial Hospital – Tell City
Pinnacle Hospital – Crown Point
Portage Hospital – Portage
Porter Regional Hospital – Valparaiso
Pulaski Memorial Hospital – Winamac
Putnam County Hospital – Greencastle
Regency Hospital of Northwest Indiana – East Chicago
Rehabilitation Hospital of Fort Wayne – Fort Wayne
Rehabilitation Hospital of Indiana – Indianapolis
Reid Hospital and Health Care Services – Richmond
Richmond State Hospital – Richmond
Riley Hospital for Children – Indianapolis
Riverside Hospital Corporation – South Bend
Riverview Hospital – Noblesville
Rush Memorial Hospital – Rushville
Saint John's Health System – Anderson
Schneck Medical Center – Seymour
Scott County Memorial Hospital – Scottsburg
Select Specialty Hospital - Beech Grove – Beech Grove
Select Specialty Hospital - Bloomington – Bloomington
Select Specialty Hospital - Evansville – Evansville
Select Specialty Hospital - Fort Wayne – Fort Wayne
Select Specialty Hospital - Indianapolis – Indianapolis
Select Specialty Hospital - Northwest Indiana – Hammond
Sidney & Lois Eskenazi Hospital – Indianapolis
Southern Indiana Rehabilitation Hospital – New Albany
Southlake Center for Mental Health – Merrillville
St. Catherine Hospital – East Chicago
St. Elizabeth Ann Seton Hospital of Carmel – Carmel
St. Elizabeth Ann Seton Hospital of Indianapolis – Indianapolis
St. Elizabeth Ann Seton Hospital of Kokomo – Kokomo
St. Joseph Hospital – Fort Wayne
St. Joseph Hospital and Health Center – Kokomo
St. Joseph Regional Medical Center – Mishawaka
St. Joseph's Hospital of Huntingburg – Huntingburg
St. Joseph's Regional Medical Center – Plymouth
St. Mary Medical Center – Hobart
St. Mary's Warrick Hospital – Boonville
St. Vincent Anderson Regional Hospital – Anderson
St. Vincent Carmel Hospital – Carmel
St. Vincent Clay Hospital – Brazil
St. Vincent Evansville - Evansville
St. Vincent Fishers Hospital – Fishers
St. Vincent Frankfort Hospital – Frankfort
St. Vincent Indianapolis Hospital – Indianapolis
St. Vincent Jennings Hospital – North Vernon
St. Vincent Mercy Hospital – Elwood
St. Vincent Pediatric Rehabilitation Center – Indianapolis
St. Vincent Randolph Hospital – Winchester
St. Vincent Williamsport Hospital – Williamsport
Sullivan County Community Hospital – Sullivan
Terre Haute Regional Hospital – Terre Haute
Union Hospital – Terre Haute
Wabash County Hospital – Wabash
Wabash Valley Hospital – West Lafayette
Washington County Memorial Hospital – Salem
Wellstone Regional Hospital – Jeffersonville
West Central Community Hospital – Clinton
White County Memorial Hospital – Monticello
Witham Health Services – Lebanon
Woodlawn Hospital – Rochester

See also
List of hospitals in Indianapolis
Lists of hospitals in the United States

References

External links 
Indiana State Department of Health Hospital Directory
Indiana Hospitals

Indiana

Hospitals